Agromyces indicus is a Gram-positive, rod-shaped and non-motile bacterium from the genus of Agromyces which has been isolated from mangroves sediments from the Chorao Island in India.

References 

Microbacteriaceae
Bacteria described in 2012